The 2011 European Cup Winter Throwing was held on 19 and 20 March 2011 at the National Sports Academy in Sofia, Bulgaria. It was the eleventh edition of the athletics competition for throwing events and was jointly organised by the European Athletic Association and the Bulgarian Athletic Federation.

The competition featured men's and women's contests in shot put, discus throw, javelin throw and hammer throw. In addition to the senior competitions, there were also under-23 events for younger athletes. The first day of events was affected by poor weather, but Hungarian Olympic hammer thrower Krisztián Pars produced a series of throws over 79 metres, with a best of 79.84 m to win the men's event. Vira Rebryk won the under-23 women's javelin, while runner-up Liina Laasma broke the Estonian junior record. On the second day, eighteen-year-old javelin thrower Zigismunds Sirmais won the men's senior gold medal with a world junior record mark of 84.47 m. Turkey's Fatih Avan set a national record in the javelin to win in the under-23 section.

Medal summary

Senior men

Senior women

Under-23 men

Under-23 women

References

Results
Sofia  BUL  19 - 20 March. Tilastopaja. Retrieved on 2011-03-23.

External links
Official website

European Throwing Cup
European Cup Winter Throwing
Sports competitions in Sofia
2011 in Bulgarian sport
2011 in European sport
International athletics competitions hosted by Bulgaria